Daniel Alexander Young (born May 27, 1994) is an American professional pitcher in the Atlanta Braves organization. He made his MLB debut in 2022 with the Seattle Mariners.

Career
Young graduated from Saint Andrew's School in Boca Raton, Florida, in 2012. He attended the University of Florida to play college baseball for the Florida Gators.

Toronto Blue Jays
The Toronto Blue Jays selected Young in the eighth round of the 2015 MLB draft. He made his professional debut in 2015 for the Low-A Vancouver Canadians, posting a 1-1 record and 6.33 ERA with 8 strikeouts in 27.0 innings pitched. In 2016, Young pitched in 21 games for the Lansing Lugnuts, recording a 2-1 record and 2.70 ERA with 18 strikeouts in 23.1 innings of work.

In 2017, Young split 47 appearances between the High-A Dunedin Blue Jays and the Double-A New Hampshire Fisher Cats, posting a cumulative 4-1 record and 3.00 ERA with 50 strikeouts and 4 saves in 63.0 innings pitched. The following season, Young returned to New Hampshire, logging a 2-0 record and 4.13 ERA with 48 strikeouts in 56.2 innings pitched. For the 2019 season, Young made 37 appearances split between New Hampshire and the Triple-A Buffalo Bisons, pitching to a cumulative 1-2 record and 2.76 ERA with 42 strikeouts in 49.0 innings of work.

Cleveland Indians / Guardians
On December 12, 2019, Young was selected by the Cleveland Indians in the minor league phase of the Rule 5 draft. Young did not play in a game in 2020 due to the cancellation of the minor league season because of the COVID-19 pandemic. In 2021, Young made 40 appearances for the Triple-A Columbus Clippers, logging a 2-2 record and 4.47 ERA with 58 strikeouts in 52.1 innings pitched. He elected free agency following the season on November 7, 2021.

Seattle Mariners
On February 9, 2022, Young signed a minor league contract with the Seattle Mariners organization. He was assigned to the Triple-A Tacoma Rainiers to begin the 2022 season.

The Mariners promoted Young to the major leagues for the first time on May 5, 2022. He made his MLB debut on May 9 in relief against the Philadelphia Phillies, recording three strikeouts. He made 2 appearances for the Mariners, recording a 7.36 ERA across 3.2 innings pitched. He was designated for assignment on August 1, 2022.

Atlanta Braves
On August 6, 2022, Young was claimed off waivers by the Atlanta Braves. He made one appearances for Atlanta, tossing 2.2 scoreless innings against the New York Mets on August 15. He was designated for assignment the following day. On August 18, he cleared waivers and was sent outright to the Triple-A Gwinnett Stripers. He made 11 appearances for Gwinnett down the stretch, posting a 3.24 ERA with 17 strikeouts in 8.1 innings pitched.

See also
Rule 5 draft results

References

External links

Living people
1994 births
Sportspeople from Boynton Beach, Florida
Baseball players from Florida
Major League Baseball pitchers
Seattle Mariners players
Atlanta Braves players
Florida Gators baseball players
Wisconsin Woodchucks players
Vancouver Canadians players
Lansing Lugnuts players
Dunedin Blue Jays players
New Hampshire Fisher Cats players
Peoria Javelinas players
Buffalo Bisons (minor league) players
Columbus Clippers players
Tacoma Rainiers players